Believe (2005) is a darkwave-rock EP by Dianna St. Hilaire, better known as Versailles.

Believe began the first worldwide distribution of Versailles' albums. Mass-produced through her own label, Evileye Records, Versailles began the launch of her professional career. Believe was also coupled with a music video when it first launched in 2005, which can still be found on Versailles YouTube page. The EP also contains a remix of the song "Believe". Some of the instruments used in production were a spinet piano and an old Prophet 600 keyboard.

Track listing
 Believe
 Lamentations
 You're My Disaster
 Believe (Electric Dead Tree Mix)

References

2005 albums